Wissam Gassid Kadhim Al-Jaberi (born 13 February 1981), known as Wissam Gassid, is an Iraqi former professional football goalkeeper. He is currently the goalkeeping coach of Al-Kahrabaa FC.

Wissam's younger brother, Mohammed, is also a goalkeeper, and plays for Al-Zawraa in Iraq.

Honours

Country 
 2002 WAFF Cup: Champions
 2005 West Asian Games: Gold medal
 2013 World Men's Military Cup: Champions

External links 

Profile on Goalzz

Iraqi footballers
Sportspeople from Baghdad
Al-Zawraa SC players
1981 births
Living people
Al-Quwa Al-Jawiya players
Al-Shorta SC players
Association football goalkeepers
Iraq international footballers